Ratlam District is a district of Madhya Pradesh state in central India. The town of Ratlam is administrative headquarters of the district.

Geography
It is bounded by Mandsaur District to the north, Jhalawar District of Rajasthan state to the northwest, Ujjain District to the east, Dhar District to the south, Jhabua District to the southwest, and Pratapgarh District of Rajasthan to the west. It is divided into nine tehsils and is home to 9 at and 1,063 villages (as of 2001). The district is part of Ujjain Division.

Information

Ratlam District was created after Indian independence in 1947, out of the territory of several princely states, including Ratlam State, Jaora State, Sailana State and Piploda State. Ratlam District was part of the new state of Madhya Bharat. The major stop for tourism in Ratlam district is the town of Sailana which is known for its cactus garden, Palace, Kharmor Bird Sanctuary and the cave temples of Kedareshwa. Ratlam city is known for Garadu (fried Yam), Sev and Gold. Ratlam also has a DRM office of Railway.

Demographics

According to the 2011 census Ratlam District has a population of 1,455,069  roughly equal to the nation of Eswatini or the US state of Hawaii. This gives it a ranking of 342nd in India (out of a total of 640). Its population growth rate over the decade of 2001-2011 was 19.67%. Ratlam has a sex ratio of 973 females for every 1,000 males, and a literacy rate of 68.03%. 29.90% of the population lives in urban areas. Scheduled Castes and Tribes made up 13.65% and 28.16% of the population respectively.

At the time of the 2011 Census of India, 42.33% of the population in the district spoke Malvi, 41.38% Hindi, 13.59% Bhili and 1.27% Urdu as their first language.

References

External links

 Official website

 
Districts of Madhya Pradesh
1949 establishments in India